Eulepidotis testaceiceps is a moth of the family Erebidae first described by Felder and Rogenhofer in 1874. It is found in the Neotropics, including Costa Rica, French Guiana and Guyana.

References

Moths described in 1874
testaceiceps